The Butterfly Man is a 1920 American silent drama film directed by Ida May Park, starring Lew Cody, Louise Lovely, and Lila Leslie, and produced by Louis J. Gasnier.

Cast
 Lew Cody as Sedgewick Blynn
 Louise Lovely as 	Bessie Morgan
 Lila Leslie as 	Mrs. Trend 
 Rosemary Theby as Mrs. Fielding
 Martha Mattox as 	Anna Blynn
 Mary Land as Martha Blynn
 Alberta Lee as Mrs. Blynn
 Augustus Phillips as Mr. Trend
 Alec B. Francis as 	James Bachelor
 Andrew Robson as John D. Morgan
 Esther Ralston

References

Bibliography
 Jeff Codori. Film History through Trade Journal Art, 1916–1920. Jeferson, NC: McFarland, 2020.
 Connelly, Robert B. The Silents: Silent Feature Films, 1910-36, Volume 40, Issue 2. December Press, 1998.
 Munden, Kenneth White. The American Film Institute Catalog of Motion Pictures Produced in the United States, Part 1. University of California Press, 1997.

External links
 

1920 films
1920 drama films
1920s English-language films
American silent feature films
Silent American drama films
Films directed by Louis J. Gasnier
Films directed by Ida May Park
American black-and-white films
Film Booking Offices of America films
1920s American films